The Deadfaced Dimension is the fourth studio album from Dutch hardcore producer and DJ Angerfist, released in November 2014 through Masters of Hardcore.

Track listing

Disc 1

Disc 2

Disc 3

References 

2014 albums
Angerfist albums